A shoe tree may refer to:

 Shoe tree (decorated plant), a perennial woody plant decorated with pairs of hung shoes
 Shoe tree (device),  a device placed inside of a shoe to preserve its shape